A wallpaper is a mathematical object covering a whole Euclidean plane by repeating a motif indefinitely, in manner that certain isometries keep the drawing unchanged. To a given wallpaper there corresponds a group of such congruent transformations, with function composition as the group operation. Thus, a wallpaper group (or plane symmetry group or plane crystallographic group) is in a mathematical classification of a two‑dimensional repetitive pattern, based on the symmetries in the pattern. Such patterns occur frequently in architecture and decorative art, especially in textiles, tessellations and tiles as well as wallpaper.

What this page calls pattern

Any periodic tiling can be seen as a wallpaper. More particularly, we can consider as a wallpaper a tiling by identical tiles edge‑to‑edge, necessarily periodic, and conceive from it a wallpaper by decorating in the same manner every tiling element, and eventually erase partly or entirely the boundaries between these tiles. Conversely, from every wallpaper we can construct such a tiling by identical tiles edge‑to‑edge, which bear each identical ornaments, the identical outlines of these tiles being not necessarily visible on the original wallpaper. Such repeated boundaries delineate a repetitive surface added here in dashed lines.

Such pseudo‑tilings connected to a given wallpaper are in infinite number. For example image 1 shows two models of repetitive squares in two different positions, which have  Another repetitive square has an  We could indefinitely conceive such repetitive squares larger and larger. An infinity of shapes of repetitive zones are possible for this Pythagorean tiling, in an infinity of positions on this wallpaper. For example in red on the bottom right‑hand corner of image 1, we could glide its repetitive parallelogram in one or another position. In common on the first two images: a repetitive square concentric with each small square tile, their common center being a point symmetry of the wallpaper.

Between identical tiles edge‑to‑edge, an edge is not necessarily a segment of right line. On the top left‑hand corner of image 3, point C  is a vertex of a repetitive pseudo‑rhombus with thick stripes on its whole surface, called pseudo‑rhombus because of a concentric repetitive rhombus  constructed from it by taking out a bit of surface somewhere to append it elsewhere, and keep the area unchanged. By the same process on image 3, a repetitive regular hexagon filled with vertical stripes is constructed from a rhombic repetitive zone  Conversely, from elementary geometric tiles edge‑to‑edge, an artist like M. C. Escher created attractive surfaces many times repeated. On image 2,   the minimum area of a repetitive surface by disregarding colors, each repetitive zone in dashed lines consisting of five pieces in a certain arrangement, to be either a square or a hexagon, like in a proof of the Pythagorean theorem.

In the present article, a pattern is a repetitive parallelogram of minimal area in a determined position on the wallpaper. Image 1 shows two parallelogram‑shaped patterns — a square is a particular parallelogram —. Image 3 shows rhombic patterns — a rhombus is a particular parallelogram —.

On this page, all repetitive patterns (of minimal area) are constructed from two translations that generate the group of all translations under which the wallpaper is invariant. With the circle shaped symbol ⵔ of function composition, a pair like  or  generates the group of all translations that transform the Pythagorean tiling into itself.

Possible groups linked to a pattern

A wallpaper remains on the whole unchanged under certain isometries, starting with certain translations that confer on the wallpaper a repetitive nature. One of the reasons to be unchanged under certain translations is that it covers the whole plane. No mathematical object in our minds is stuck onto a motionless wall! On the contrary an observer or his eye is motionless in front of a transformation, which glides or rotates or flips a wallpaper, eventually could distort it, but that would be out of our subject.

If an isometry leaves unchanged a given wallpaper, then the inverse isometry keeps it also unchanged, like translation   on image 1, 3 or 4, or a ± 120° rotation around a point like S  on image 3 or 4. If they have both this property to leave unchanged a wallpaper, two isometries composed in one or the other order have then this same property to leave unchanged the wallpaper. To be exhaustive about the concepts of group and subgroups under the function composition, represented by the circle shaped symbol ⵔ, here is a traditional truism in mathematics:  everything remains itself under the identity transformation. This identity function can be called translation of zero vector or rotation of 360°.

A glide can be represented by one or several arrows if parallel and of same length and same sense, in same way a wallpaper can be represented either by a few patterns or by only one pattern, considered as a pseudo‑tile imagined repeated edge‑to‑edge with an infinite number of replicas. Image 3 shows two patterns with two different contents, and the one in dark dashed lines or one of its images under  represents the same wallpaper on the following image 4, by disregarding the colors. Certainly a color is perceived subjectively whereas a wallpaper is an ideal object, however any color can be seen as a label that characterizes certain surfaces, we might think of a hexadecimal code of color as a label specific to certain zones. It may be added that a well‑known theorem deals with colors.

Groups are registered in the catalog by examining properties of a parallelogram, edge‑to‑edge with its replicas. For example its diagonals intersect at their common midpoints, center and symmetry point of any parallelogram, not necessarily symmetry point of its content. Other example, the midpoint of a full side shared by two patterns is the center of a new repetitive parallelogram formed by the two together, center which is not necessarily symmetry point of the content of this double parallelogram. Other possible symmetry point, two patterns symmetric one to the other with respect to their common vertex form together a new repetitive surface, the center of which is not necessarily symmetry point of its content.

Certain rotational symmetries are possible only for certain shapes of pattern. For example on image 2, a Pythagorean tiling is sometimes called pinwheel tilings because of its rotational symmetry of 90 degrees about the center of a tile, either small or large, or about the center of any replica of tile, of course. Also when two equilateral triangles form edge‑to‑edge a rhombic pattern, like on image 4 or 5 (future image 5), a rotational symmetry of 120 degrees about a vertex of a 120° angle, formed by two sides of pattern, is not always a symmetry point of the content of the regular hexagon formed by three patterns together sharing a vertex, because they does not always contain the same motif.

First examples of groups

The simplest wallpaper group, Group p1, applies when there is no symmetry other than the fact that a pattern repeats over regular intervals in two dimensions, as shown in the section on p1 below.

The following examples are patterns with more forms of symmetry:

Examples A and B have the same wallpaper group; it is called p4m in the IUCr notation and *442 in the orbifold notation. Example C has a different wallpaper group, called p4g or 4*2 . The fact that A and B have the same wallpaper group means that they have the same symmetries, regardless of details of the designs, whereas C has a different set of symmetries despite any superficial similarities.

The number of symmetry groups depends on the number of dimensions in the patterns. Wallpaper groups apply to the two-dimensional case, intermediate in complexity between the simpler frieze groups and the three-dimensional space groups. Subtle differences may place similar patterns in different groups, while patterns that are very different in style, color, scale or orientation may belong to the same group.

A proof that there are only 17 distinct groups of such planar symmetries was first carried out by Evgraf Fedorov in 1891 and then derived independently by George Pólya in 1924. The proof that the list of wallpaper groups is complete only came after the much harder case of space groups had been done.

Symmetries of patterns
A symmetry of a pattern is, loosely speaking, a way of transforming the pattern so that it looks exactly the same after the transformation. For example, translational symmetry is present when the pattern can be translated (in other words, shifted) some finite distance and appear unchanged. Think of shifting a set of vertical stripes horizontally by one stripe. The pattern is unchanged. Strictly speaking, a true symmetry only exists in patterns that repeat exactly and continue indefinitely. A set of only, say, five stripes does not have translational symmetry—when shifted, the stripe on one end "disappears" and a new stripe is "added" at the other end. In practice, however, classification is applied to finite patterns, and small imperfections may be ignored.

The types of transformations that are relevant here are called Euclidean plane isometries. For example:

 If one shifts example B one unit to the right, so that each square covers the square that was originally adjacent to it, then the resulting pattern is exactly the same as the starting pattern. This type of symmetry is called a translation. Examples A and C are similar, except that the smallest possible shifts are in diagonal directions.
 If one turns example B clockwise by 90°, around the centre of one of the squares, again one obtains exactly the same pattern. This is called a rotation. Examples A and C also have 90° rotations, although it requires a little more ingenuity to find the correct centre of rotation for C.
 One can also flip example B across a horizontal axis that runs across the middle of the image. This is called a reflection. Example B also has reflections across a vertical axis, and across two diagonal axes. The same can be said for A.

However, example C is different. It only has reflections in horizontal and vertical directions, not across diagonal axes. If one flips across a diagonal line, one does not get the same pattern back, but the original pattern shifted across by a certain distance. This is part of the reason that the wallpaper group of A and B is different from the wallpaper group of C.

Another transformation is "Glide", a combination of reflection and translation parallel to the line of reflection.

Formal definition and discussion
Mathematically, a wallpaper group or plane crystallographic group is a type of topologically discrete group of isometries of the Euclidean plane that contains two linearly independent translations.

Two such isometry groups are of the same type (of the same wallpaper group) if they are the same up to an affine transformation of the plane. Thus e.g. a translation of the plane (hence a translation of the mirrors and centres of rotation) does not affect the wallpaper group. The same applies for a change of angle between translation vectors, provided that it does not add or remove any symmetry (this is only the case if there are no mirrors and no glide reflections, and rotational symmetry is at most of order 2).

Unlike in the three-dimensional case, one can equivalently restrict the affine transformations to those that preserve orientation.

It follows from the Bieberbach theorem that all wallpaper groups are different even as abstract groups (as opposed to e.g. frieze groups, of which two are isomorphic with Z).

2D patterns with double translational symmetry can be categorized according to their symmetry group type.

Isometries of the Euclidean plane
Isometries of the Euclidean plane fall into four categories (see the article Euclidean plane isometry for more information).
Translations, denoted by Tv, where v is a vector in R2. This has the effect of shifting the plane applying displacement vector v.
Rotations, denoted by Rc,θ, where c is a point in the plane (the centre of rotation), and θ is the angle of rotation.
Reflections, or mirror isometries, denoted by FL, where L is a line in R2. (F is for "flip"). This has the effect of reflecting the plane in the line L, called the reflection axis or the associated mirror.
Glide reflections, denoted by GL,d, where L is a line in R2 and d is a distance. This is a combination of a reflection in the line L and a translation along L by a distance d.

The independent translations condition
The condition on linearly independent translations means that there exist linearly independent vectors v and w (in R2) such that the group contains both Tv and Tw.

The purpose of this condition is to distinguish wallpaper groups from frieze groups, which possess a translation but not two linearly independent ones, and from two-dimensional discrete point groups, which have no translations at all. In other words, wallpaper groups represent patterns that repeat themselves in two distinct directions, in contrast to frieze groups, which only repeat along a single axis.

(It is possible to generalise this situation. One could for example study discrete groups of isometries of Rn with m linearly independent translations, where m is any integer in the range 0 ≤ m ≤ n.)

The discreteness condition
The discreteness condition means that there is some positive real number ε, such that for every translation Tv in the group, the vector v has length at least ε (except of course in the case that v is the zero vector, but the independent translations condition prevents this, since any set that contains the zero vector is linearly dependent by definition and thus disallowed).

The purpose of this condition is to ensure that the group has a compact fundamental domain, or in other words, a "cell" of nonzero, finite area, which is repeated through the plane. Without this condition, one might have for example a group containing the translation Tx for every rational number x, which would not correspond to any reasonable wallpaper pattern.

One important and nontrivial consequence of the discreteness condition in combination with the independent translations condition is that the group can only contain rotations of order 2, 3, 4, or 6; that is, every rotation in the group must be a rotation by 180°, 120°, 90°, or 60°. This fact is known as the crystallographic restriction theorem, and can be generalised to higher-dimensional cases.

Notations for wallpaper groups

Crystallographic notation
Crystallography has 230 space groups to distinguish, far more than the 17 wallpaper groups, but many of the symmetries in the groups are the same. Thus one can use a similar notation for both kinds of groups, that of Carl Hermann and Charles-Victor Mauguin. An example of a full wallpaper name in Hermann-Mauguin style (also called IUCr notation) is p31m, with four letters or digits; more usual is a shortened name like cmm or pg.

For wallpaper groups the full notation begins with either p or c, for a primitive cell or a face-centred cell; these are explained below. This is followed by a digit, n, indicating the highest order of rotational symmetry: 1-fold (none), 2-fold, 3-fold, 4-fold, or 6-fold. The next two symbols indicate symmetries relative to one translation axis of the pattern, referred to as the "main" one; if there is a mirror perpendicular to a translation axis that is the main one (or if there are two, one of them). The symbols are either m, g, or 1, for mirror, glide reflection, or none. The axis of the mirror or glide reflection is perpendicular to the main axis for the first letter, and either parallel or tilted 180°/n (when n > 2) for the second letter. Many groups include other symmetries implied by the given ones. The short notation drops digits or an m that can be deduced, so long as that leaves no confusion with another group.

A primitive cell is a minimal region repeated by lattice translations. All but two wallpaper symmetry groups are described with respect to primitive cell axes, a coordinate basis using the translation vectors of the lattice. In the remaining two cases symmetry description is with respect to centred cells that are larger than the primitive cell, and hence have internal repetition; the directions of their sides is different from those of the translation vectors spanning a primitive cell. Hermann-Mauguin notation for crystal space groups uses additional cell types.

Examples
 p2 (p2): Primitive cell, 2-fold rotation symmetry, no mirrors or glide reflections.
 p4gm (p4mm): Primitive cell, 4-fold rotation, glide reflection perpendicular to main axis, mirror axis at 45°.
 c2mm (c2mm): Centred cell, 2-fold rotation, mirror axes both perpendicular and parallel to main axis.
 p31m (p31m): Primitive cell, 3-fold rotation, mirror axis at 60°.

Here are all the names that differ in short and full notation.

{| class="wikitable"
|+ Crystallographic short and full names
! Short
! pm
! pg
! cm
! pmm
! pmg
! pgg
! cmm
! p4m
! p4g
! p6m
|- style="background:white"
! Full || p1m1 || p1g1 || c1m1 || p2mm || p2mg || p2gg || c2mm || p4mm || p4gm || p6mm
|}

The remaining names are p1, p2, p3, p3m1, p31m, p4, and p6.

Orbifold notation
Orbifold notation for wallpaper groups, advocated by John Horton Conway (Conway, 1992) (Conway 2008), is based not on crystallography, but on topology. One can fold the infinite periodic tiling of the plane into its essence, an orbifold, then describe that with a few symbols.

A digit, n, indicates a centre of n-fold rotation corresponding to a cone point on the orbifold. By the crystallographic restriction theorem, n must be 2, 3, 4, or 6.
An asterisk, *, indicates a mirror symmetry corresponding to a boundary of the orbifold. It interacts with the digits as follows:
Digits before * denote centres of pure rotation (cyclic).
Digits after * denote centres of rotation with mirrors through them, corresponding to "corners" on the boundary of the orbifold (dihedral).
A cross, ×, occurs when a glide reflection is present and indicates a crosscap on the orbifold. Pure mirrors combine with lattice translation to produce glides, but those are already accounted for so need no notation.
The "no symmetry" symbol, o, stands alone, and indicates there are only lattice translations with no other symmetry. The orbifold with this symbol is a torus; in general the symbol o denotes a handle on the orbifold.

The group denoted in crystallographic notation by cmm will, in Conway's notation, be 2*22. The 2 before the * says there is a 2-fold rotation centre with no mirror through it. The * itself says there is a mirror. The first 2 after the * says there is a 2-fold rotation centre on a mirror. The final 2 says there is an independent second 2-fold rotation centre on a mirror, one that is not a duplicate of the first one under symmetries.

The group denoted by pgg will be 22×. There are two pure 2-fold rotation centres, and a glide reflection axis. Contrast this with pmg, Conway 22*, where crystallographic notation mentions a glide, but one that is implicit in the other symmetries of the orbifold.

Coxeter's bracket notation is also included, based on reflectional Coxeter groups, and modified with plus superscripts accounting for rotations, improper rotations and translations.

Why there are exactly seventeen groups
An orbifold can be viewed as a polygon with face, edges, and vertices which can be unfolded to form a possibly infinite set of polygons which tile either the sphere, the plane or the hyperbolic plane. When it tiles the plane it will give a wallpaper group and when it tiles the sphere or hyperbolic plane it gives either a spherical symmetry group or Hyperbolic symmetry group. The type of space the polygons tile can be found by calculating the Euler characteristic, χ = V − E + F, where V is the number of corners (vertices), E is the number of edges and F is the number of faces. If the Euler characteristic is positive then the orbifold has an elliptic (spherical) structure; if it is zero then it has a parabolic structure, i.e. a wallpaper group; and if it is negative it will have a hyperbolic structure. When the full set of possible orbifolds is enumerated it is found that only 17 have Euler characteristic 0.

When an orbifold replicates by symmetry to fill the plane, its features create a structure of vertices, edges, and polygon faces, which must be consistent with the Euler characteristic. Reversing the process, one can assign numbers to the features of the orbifold, but fractions, rather than whole numbers. Because the orbifold itself is a quotient of the full surface by the symmetry group, the orbifold Euler characteristic is a quotient of the surface Euler characteristic by the order of the symmetry group.

The orbifold Euler characteristic is 2 minus the sum of the feature values, assigned as follows:
Both * and × count as 1.
The "no symmetry" o counts as 2.

For a wallpaper group, the sum for the characteristic must be zero; thus the feature sum must be 2.

Examples
632:  +  +  = 2
3*3:  + 1 +  = 2
4*2:  + 1 +  = 2
22×:  +  + 1 = 2

Now enumeration of all wallpaper groups becomes a matter of arithmetic, of listing all feature strings with values summing to 2.

Feature strings with other sums are not nonsense; they imply non-planar tilings, not discussed here. (When the orbifold Euler characteristic is negative, the tiling is hyperbolic; when positive, spherical or bad).

Guide to recognizing wallpaper groups
To work out which wallpaper group corresponds to a given design, one may use the following table.

See also this overview with diagrams.

The seventeen groups
Each of the groups in this section has two cell structure diagrams, which are to be interpreted as follows (it is the shape that is significant, not the colour):

On the right-hand side diagrams, different equivalence classes of symmetry elements are colored (and rotated) differently.

The brown or yellow area indicates a fundamental domain, i.e. the smallest part of the pattern that is repeated.

The diagrams on the right show the cell of the lattice corresponding to the smallest translations; those on the left sometimes show a larger area.

Group p1 (o) 
[[File:SymBlend p1.svg|thumb|Example and diagram for p1]]
{| class=wikitable
|+ Cell structures for p1 by lattice type
!colspan=3|Oblique
!colspan=3|Hexagonal
|-
!colspan=2|Rectangular
!colspan=2|Rhombic
!colspan=2|Square
|}

 Orbifold signature: o
 Coxeter notation (rectangular): [∞+,2,∞+] or [∞]+×[∞]+
 Lattice: oblique
 Point group: C1
 The group p1 contains only translations; there are no rotations, reflections, or glide reflections.
Examples of group p1

The two translations (cell sides) can each have different lengths, and can form any angle.

 Group p2 (2222)
[[File:SymBlend p2.svg|right|thumb|Example and diagram for p2]]
{| class=wikitable
|+ Cell structures for p2 by lattice type
!colspan=3|Oblique
!colspan=3|Hexagonal
|-
!colspan=2|Rectangular
!colspan=2|Rhombic
!colspan=2|Square
|}
 Orbifold signature: 2222
 Coxeter notation (rectangular): [∞,2,∞]+
 Lattice: oblique
 Point group: C2
 The group p2 contains four rotation centres of order two (180°), but no reflections or glide reflections.

Examples of group p2

 Group pm (**)

 Orbifold signature: **
 Coxeter notation: [∞,2,∞+] or [∞+,2,∞]
 Lattice: rectangular
 Point group: D1
 The group pm has no rotations. It has reflection axes, they are all parallel.

Examples of group pm

(The first three have a vertical symmetry axis, and the last two each have a different diagonal one.)

Group pg (××)

 Orbifold signature: ××
 Coxeter notation: [(∞,2)+,∞+] or [∞+,(2,∞)+]
 Lattice: rectangular
 Point group: D1
 The group pg contains glide reflections only, and their axes are all parallel. There are no rotations or reflections.

Examples of group pg

Without the details inside the zigzag bands the mat is pmg; with the details but without the distinction between brown and black it is pgg.

Ignoring the wavy borders of the tiles, the pavement is pgg.

Group cm (*×)

 Orbifold signature: *×
 Coxeter notation: [∞+,2+,∞] or [∞,2+,∞+]
 Lattice: rhombic
 Point group: D1
 The group cm contains no rotations. It has reflection axes, all parallel. There is at least one glide reflection whose axis is not a reflection axis; it is halfway between two adjacent parallel reflection axes.
This group applies for symmetrically staggered rows (i.e. there is a shift per row of half the translation distance inside the rows) of identical objects, which have a symmetry axis perpendicular to the rows.

Examples of group cm

Group pmm (*2222)

 Orbifold signature: *2222
 Coxeter notation (rectangular): [∞,2,∞] or [∞]×[∞]
 Coxeter notation (square): [4,1+,4] or [1+,4,4,1+]
 Lattice: rectangular
 Point group: D2
 The group pmm has reflections in two perpendicular directions, and four rotation centres of order two (180°) located at the intersections of the reflection axes.

Examples of group pmm

Group pmg (22*)

 Orbifold signature: 22*
 Coxeter notation: [(∞,2)+,∞] or [∞,(2,∞)+]
 Lattice: rectangular
 Point group: D2
 The group pmg has two rotation centres of order two (180°), and reflections in only one direction. It has glide reflections whose axes are perpendicular to the reflection axes. The centres of rotation all lie on glide reflection axes.

Examples of group pmg

Group pgg (22×)

 Orbifold signature: 22×
 Coxeter notation (rectangular): [((∞,2)+,(∞,2)+)]
 Coxeter notation (square): [4+,4+]
 Lattice: rectangular
 Point group: D2
 The group pgg contains two rotation centres of order two (180°), and glide reflections in two perpendicular directions. The centres of rotation are not located on the glide reflection axes. There are no reflections.

Examples of group pgg

Group cmm (2*22)

 Orbifold signature: 2*22
 Coxeter notation (rhombic): [∞,2+,∞]
 Coxeter notation (square): [(4,4,2+)]
 Lattice: rhombic
 Point group: D2
 The group cmm has reflections in two perpendicular directions, and a rotation of order two (180°) whose centre is not on a reflection axis. It also has two rotations whose centres are on a reflection axis.
This group is frequently seen in everyday life, since the most common arrangement of bricks in a brick building (running bond) utilises this group (see example below).

The rotational symmetry of order 2 with centres of rotation at the centres of the sides of the rhombus is a consequence of the other properties.

The pattern corresponds to each of the following:
symmetrically staggered rows of identical doubly symmetric objects
a checkerboard pattern of two alternating rectangular tiles, of which each, by itself, is doubly symmetric
a checkerboard pattern of alternatingly a 2-fold rotationally symmetric rectangular tile and its mirror image

Examples of group cmm

Group p4 (442)
[[File:SymBlend p4.svg|right|thumb|Example and diagram for p4]]
[[File:Wallpaper group diagram p4 square.svg|left|thumb|Cell structure for p4]]
 Orbifold signature: 442
 Coxeter notation: [4,4]+
 Lattice: square
 Point group: C4
 The group p4 has two rotation centres of order four (90°), and one rotation centre of order two (180°). It has no reflections or glide reflections.

Examples of group p4

A p4 pattern can be looked upon as a repetition in rows and columns of equal square tiles with 4-fold rotational symmetry. Also it can be looked upon as a checkerboard pattern of two such tiles, a factor  smaller and rotated 45°.

 Group p4m (*442)

 Orbifold signature: *442
 Coxeter notation: [4,4]
 Lattice: square
 Point group: D4
 The group p4m has two rotation centres of order four (90°), and reflections in four distinct directions (horizontal, vertical, and diagonals). It has additional glide reflections whose axes are not reflection axes; rotations of order two (180°) are centred at the intersection of the glide reflection axes. All rotation centres lie on reflection axes.

This corresponds to a straightforward grid of rows and columns of equal squares with the four reflection axes. Also it corresponds to a checkerboard pattern of two of such squares.

Examples of group p4m

Examples displayed with the smallest translations horizontal and vertical (like in the diagram):

Examples displayed with the smallest translations diagonal:

Group p4g (4*2)

 Orbifold signature: 4*2
 Coxeter notation: [4+,4]
 Lattice: square
 Point group: D4
 The group p4g has two centres of rotation of order four (90°), which are each other's mirror image, but it has reflections in only two directions, which are perpendicular. There are rotations of order two (180°) whose centres are located at the intersections of reflection axes. It has glide reflections axes parallel to the reflection axes, in between them, and also at an angle of 45° with these.
A p4g pattern can be looked upon as a checkerboard pattern of copies of a square tile with 4-fold rotational symmetry, and its mirror image. Alternatively it can be looked upon (by shifting half a tile) as a checkerboard pattern of copies of a horizontally and vertically symmetric tile and its 90° rotated version. Note that neither applies for a plain checkerboard pattern of black and white tiles, this is group p4m (with diagonal translation cells).

Examples of group p4g

Group p3 (333)
[[File:SymBlend p3.svg|right|thumb|Example and diagram for p3]]
[[File:Wallpaper group diagram p3.svg|left|thumb|Cell structure for p3]]
 Orbifold signature: 333
 Coxeter notation: [(3,3,3)]+ or [3[3]]+
 Lattice: hexagonal
 Point group: C3
 The group p3 has three different rotation centres of order three (120°), but no reflections or glide reflections.

Imagine a tessellation of the plane with equilateral triangles of equal size, with the sides corresponding to the smallest translations. Then half of the triangles are in one orientation, and the other half upside down. This wallpaper group corresponds to the case that all triangles of the same orientation are equal, while both types have rotational symmetry of order three, but the two are not equal, not each other's mirror image, and not both symmetric (if the two are equal it is p6, if they are each other's mirror image it is p31m, if they are both symmetric it is p3m1; if two of the three apply then the third also, and it is p6m). For a given image, three of these tessellations are possible, each with rotation centres as vertices, i.e. for any tessellation two shifts are possible. In terms of the image: the vertices can be the red, the blue or the green triangles.

Then this wallpaper group corresponds to the case that all hexagons are equal (and in the same orientation) and have rotational symmetry of order three, while they have no mirror image symmetry (if they have rotational symmetry of order six it is p6, if they are symmetric with respect to the main diagonals it is p31m, if they are symmetric with respect to lines perpendicular to the sides it is p3m1; if two of the three apply then the third also, it is p6m). For a given image, three of these tessellations are possible, each with one third of the rotation centres as centres of the hexagons. In terms of the image: the centres of the hexagons can be the red, the blue or the green triangles.

Examples of group p3

Group p3m1 (*333)
[[File:SymBlend p3m1.svg|right|thumb|Example and diagram for p3m1]]
[[File:Wallpaper group diagram p3m1.svg|left|thumb|Cell structure for p3m1]]
 Orbifold signature: *333
 Coxeter notation: [(3,3,3)] or [3[3]]
 Lattice: hexagonal
 Point group: D3
 The group p3m1 has three different rotation centres of order three (120°). It has reflections in the three sides of an equilateral triangle. The centre of every rotation lies on a reflection axis. There are additional glide reflections in three distinct directions, whose axes are located halfway between adjacent parallel reflection axes.

Like for p3, imagine a tessellation of the plane with equilateral triangles of equal size, with the sides corresponding to the smallest translations. Then half of the triangles are in one orientation, and the other half upside down. This wallpaper group corresponds to the case that all triangles of the same orientation are equal, while both types have rotational symmetry of order three, and both are symmetric, but the two are not equal, and not each other's mirror image. For a given image, three of these tessellations are possible, each with rotation centres as vertices. In terms of the image: the vertices can be the red, the blue or the green triangles.

Examples of group p3m1

 Group p31m (3*3)

 Orbifold signature: 3*3
 Coxeter notation: [6,3+]
 Lattice: hexagonal
 Point group: D3
 The group p31m has three different rotation centres of order three (120°), of which two are each other's mirror image. It has reflections in three distinct directions. It has at least one rotation whose centre does not lie on a reflection axis. There are additional glide reflections in three distinct directions, whose axes are located halfway between adjacent parallel reflection axes.

Like for p3 and p3m1, imagine a tessellation of the plane with equilateral triangles of equal size, with the sides corresponding to the smallest translations. Then half of the triangles are in one orientation, and the other half upside down. This wallpaper group corresponds to the case that all triangles of the same orientation are equal, while both types have rotational symmetry of order three and are each other's mirror image, but not symmetric themselves, and not equal. For a given image, only one such tessellation is possible. In terms of the image: the vertices must be the red triangles, not the blue triangles.

Examples of group p31m

 Group p6 (632)
[[File:SymBlend p6.svg|right|thumb|Example and diagram for p6]]
[[File:Wallpaper group diagram p6.svg|left|thumb|Cell structure for p6]]
 Orbifold signature: 632
 Coxeter notation: [6,3]+
 Lattice: hexagonal
 Point group: C6
 The group p6 has one rotation centre of order six (60°); two rotation centres of order three (120°), which are each other's images under a rotation of 60°; and three rotation centres of order two (180°) which are also each other's images under a rotation of 60°. It has no reflections or glide reflections.

A pattern with this symmetry can be looked upon as a tessellation of the plane with equal triangular tiles with C3 symmetry, or equivalently, a tessellation of the plane with equal hexagonal tiles with C6 symmetry (with the edges of the tiles not necessarily part of the pattern).

Examples of group p6

 Group p6m (*632)

 Orbifold signature: *632
 Coxeter notation: [6,3]
 Lattice: hexagonal
 Point group: D6
 The group p6m has one rotation centre of order six (60°); it has two rotation centres of order three, which only differ by a rotation of 60° (or, equivalently, 180°), and three of order two, which only differ by a rotation of 60°. It has also reflections in six distinct directions. There are additional glide reflections in six distinct directions, whose axes are located halfway between adjacent parallel reflection axes.

A pattern with this symmetry can be looked upon as a tessellation of the plane with equal triangular tiles with D3 symmetry, or equivalently, a tessellation of the plane with equal hexagonal tiles with D6 symmetry (with the edges of the tiles not necessarily part of the pattern). Thus the simplest examples are a triangular lattice with or without connecting lines, and a hexagonal tiling with one color for outlining the hexagons and one for the background.

Examples of group p6m

Lattice types
There are five lattice types or Bravais lattices, corresponding to the five possible wallpaper groups of the lattice itself. The wallpaper group of a pattern with this lattice of translational symmetry cannot have more, but may have less symmetry than the lattice itself.
In the 5 cases of rotational symmetry of order 3 or 6, the unit cell consists of two equilateral triangles (hexagonal lattice, itself p6m). They form a rhombus with angles 60° and 120°.
In the 3 cases of rotational symmetry of order 4, the cell is a square (square lattice, itself p4m).
In the 5 cases of reflection or glide reflection, but not both, the cell is a rectangle (rectangular lattice, itself pmm). It may also be interpreted as a centered rhombic lattice. Special cases: square.
In the 2 cases of reflection combined with glide reflection, the cell is a rhombus (rhombic lattice, itself cmm). It may also be interpreted as a centered rectangular lattice. Special cases: square, hexagonal unit cell.
In the case of only rotational symmetry of order 2, and the case of no other symmetry than translational, the cell is in general a parallelogram (parallelogrammatic or oblique lattice, itself p2). Special cases: rectangle, square, rhombus, hexagonal unit cell.

Symmetry groups
The actual symmetry group should be distinguished from the wallpaper group. Wallpaper groups are collections of symmetry groups. There are 17 of these collections, but for each collection there are infinitely many symmetry groups, in the sense of actual groups of isometries. These depend, apart from the wallpaper group, on a number of parameters for the translation vectors, the orientation and position of the reflection axes and rotation centers.

The numbers of degrees of freedom are:
6 for p25 for pmm, pmg, pgg, and cmm
4 for the rest.

However, within each wallpaper group, all symmetry groups are algebraically isomorphic.

Some symmetry group isomorphisms:
p1: Z2pm: Z × D∞
pmm: D∞ × D∞.

Dependence of wallpaper groups on transformations
The wallpaper group of a pattern is invariant under isometries and uniform scaling (similarity transformations).
Translational symmetry is preserved under arbitrary bijective affine transformations.
Rotational symmetry of order two ditto; this means also that 4- and 6-fold rotation centres at least keep 2-fold rotational symmetry.
Reflection in a line and glide reflection are preserved on expansion/contraction along, or perpendicular to, the axis of reflection and glide reflection. It changes p6m, p4g, and p3m1 into cmm, p3m1 into cm, and p4m, depending on direction of expansion/contraction, into pmm or cmm. A pattern of symmetrically staggered rows of points is special in that it can convert by expansion/contraction from p6m to p4m.

Note that when a transformation decreases symmetry, a transformation of the same kind (the inverse) obviously for some patterns increases the symmetry. Such a special property of a pattern (e.g. expansion in one direction produces a pattern with 4-fold symmetry) is not counted as a form of extra symmetry.

Change of colors does not affect the wallpaper group if any two points that have the same color before the change, also have the same color after the change, and any two points that have different colors before the change, also have different colors after the change.

If the former applies, but not the latter, such as when converting a color image to one in black and white, then symmetries are preserved, but they may increase, so that the wallpaper group can change.

Web demo and software
Several software graphic tools will let you create 2D patterns using wallpaper symmetry groups. Usually you can edit the original tile and its copies in the entire pattern are updated automatically.
 MadPattern, a free set of Adobe Illustrator templates that support the 17 wallpaper groups
 Tess, a shareware tessellation program for multiple platforms, supports all wallpaper, frieze, and rosette groups, as well as Heesch tilings.
Wallpaper Symmetry is a free online JavaScript drawing tool supporting the 17 groups. The main page has an explanation of the wallpaper groups, as well as drawing tools and explanations for the other planar symmetry groups as well.
 TALES GAME, a free software designed for educational purposes which includes the tessellation function.
 Kali , online graphical symmetry editor Java applet (not supported by default in browsers).
 Kali , free downloadable Kali for Windows and Mac Classic.
 Inkscape, a free vector graphics editor, supports all 17 groups plus arbitrary scales, shifts, rotates, and color changes per row or per column, optionally randomized to a given degree. (See )
 SymmetryWorks is a commercial plugin for Adobe Illustrator, supports all 17 groups.
 EscherSketch is a free online JavaScript drawing tool supporting the 17 groups.
 Repper is a commercial online drawing tool supporting the 17 groups plus a number of non-periodic tilings

See also

List of planar symmetry groups (summary of this page)
Aperiodic tiling
Crystallography
Layer group
Mathematics and art
M. C. Escher
Point group
Symmetry groups in one dimension
Tessellation

Notes

References
 The Grammar of Ornament (1856), by Owen Jones. Many of the images in this article are from this book; it contains many more.
 John H. Conway (1992). "The Orbifold Notation for Surface Groups". In: M. W. Liebeck and J. Saxl (eds.), Groups, Combinatorics and Geometry, Proceedings of the L.M.S. Durham Symposium, July 5–15, Durham, UK, 1990; London Math. Soc. Lecture Notes Series 165. Cambridge University Press, Cambridge. pp. 438–447
 John H. Conway, Heidi Burgiel and Chaim Goodman-Strauss (2008): The Symmetries of Things. Worcester MA: A.K. Peters. .
 Branko Grünbaum and G. C. Shephard (1987): Tilings and Patterns. New York: Freeman. .
Pattern Design, Lewis F. Day

External links
International Tables for Crystallography Volume A: Space-group symmetry by the International Union of Crystallography
The 17 plane symmetry groups by David E. Joyce
Introduction to wallpaper patterns by Chaim Goodman-Strauss and Heidi Burgiel
Description by Silvio Levy
Example tiling for each group, with dynamic demos of properties
Overview with example tiling for each group, by Brian Sanderson
Escher Web Sketch, a java applet with interactive tools for drawing in all 17 plane symmetry groups
Burak, a Java applet for drawing symmetry groups. 
A JavaScript app for drawing wallpaper patterns
Circle-Pattern on Roman Mosaics in Greece
Seventeen Kinds of Wallpaper Patterns  the 17 symmetries found in traditional Japanese patterns.

Crystallography
Discrete groups
Euclidean symmetries
Ornaments